Shooting at the 2013 Southeast Asian Games took place at North Dagon Shooting Range in Yangon, Myanmar between December 11–17.

Medal summary

Men

Women

Medal table

References

 
2013 Southeast Asian Games events
Southeast Asian Games
2013
Shooting competitions in Myanmar